Canjia is a village in the Gabú Region of central-eastern Guinea-Bissau. It lies to the east of Uacaba and north of Cansisse.

References

Populated places in Guinea-Bissau
Gabu Region